Harri Millard (born 17 August 1996) is a Welsh rugby union player who plays for Cardiff Rugby as a centre. He is a Wales under-20 international.

Millard made his debut for Cardiff in 2016 having previously played for the team's academy.

References

External links 
Cardiff Rugby profile

1996 births
Living people
Cardiff Rugby players
Rugby union players from Pontypridd
Welsh rugby union players
Rugby union centres
Rugby union wings